Santa Bárbara Airport  was an airport formerly serving  Santa Bárbara, capital of the Santa Bárbara Department of  Honduras.

Current aerial images show a power line running down the middle of the former grass runway. Google Earth Historical Imagery (12/31/2010, 2/16/2015, 3/7/2018) show construction progressively covering both ends of the runway.

The airport had an earlier ICAO code of MHSZ.

See also

Transport in Honduras
List of airports in Honduras

References

External links
OpenStreetMap - Santa Bárbara

SkyVector - Santa Barbara Airport

Defunct airports
Airports in Honduras